Peter Richard Grenville Layard, Baron Layard FBA (born 15 March 1934) is a British labour economist, currently working as programme director of the Centre for Economic Performance at the London School of Economics.

Layard was Senior Research Officer for the Robbins Committee on Higher Education. His work on mental health, including publishing The Depression Report in 2006, led to the establishment of the Improving Access to Psychological Therapies (IAPT) programme in England. He is co-editor of the World Happiness Report, with John F. Helliwell and Jeffrey Sachs.

Family and education
Peter Richard Grenville Layard is the son of John Layard and his wife Doris. He was educated at Eton College, where he was a King's scholar; at King's College, Cambridge; and at the London School of Economics.

Work
Layard assisted Claus Moser on the Robbins enquiry, and later developed a reputation in the economics of education (with Mark Blaug at LSE), and labour economics (in particular with Stephen Nickell). He advocated many of the policies which characterised the New Labour government, particularly the New Deal, partly by founding the Centre for Economic Performance at the London School of Economics. One approach he took is based on the idea of welfare-to-work, where social welfare payments are structured in a way that encourages (or forces) recipients back into the job market.

As well as academic positions, Layard worked as an advisor for numerous organisations, including government institutions in the United Kingdom and Russia.

In 1990 he was founder-director of the Centre for Economic Performance at the London School of Economics. where he is presently programme director.

Happiness and wellbeing

Layard became active in the study of what has since come to be known as happiness economics. This branch of economic analysis starts from the argument that income is a bad approximation for happiness. Based on modern happiness research, he cites three factors that economists fail to take into consideration:

 Social comparisons: In contrast to what traditional economics predicts, happiness is derived from relative income as well as from absolute income. That is, if everyone gains purchasing power, some may still turn out unhappier if their position compared to others is worse. This effect may not turn economic growth into a zero-sum game entirely, but it will likely diminish the benefits people draw from their hard work. In an economy where not only companies, but individuals are constantly forced to compete with each other, life and work are experienced as a rat race.
 Adaptation: As people get used to higher income levels, their idea of a sufficient income grows with their income. If they fail to anticipate that effect, they will invest more time for work than is good for their happiness. 
 Changing tastes: Economists assume that individual preferences are constant, when in fact such preferences are not fixed but increasingly mutable, shifting constantly according to the latest trends and cultural norms. In turn, the relative values of one's accumulated possessions are subject to depreciation, ultimately having a negative effect on happiness.

From these observations, Layard concludes that taxes serve another purpose besides paying for public services (usually for public goods) and redistributing income. The third purpose is to counteract the cognitive bias that causes people to work more than is good for their happiness. That is, taxes should help citizens preserve a healthy work-life balance.

In 2005 Layard published the book Happiness: Lessons from a New Science, in which he emphasised the importance of non-income variables on aggregate happiness. His book summarises the prior empirical findings produced by economists such as Richard Easterlin, David G Blanchflower, Andrew E Clark, Rafael Di Tella, Robert MacCulloch, and Andrew Oswald. In particular he stressed the role of mental health and argued that psychological treatments ought to be much more widely available.

Subsequent books have included Happiness: Lessons from a New Science (2011), The Origins of Happiness (2018), and Can We Be Happier?: Evidence and Ethics (2020).

In 2012 he co-edited, with Jeffrey Sachs and John Helliwell, the World Happiness Report, and has been involved in subsequent years.

Layard co-founded Action for Happiness in 2010, and continues on the board.

Mental health

Layard's mental health work
resulted in the development of Improving Access to Psychological Therapies (IAPT), an initiative to improve access to psychological therapies in the United Kingdom.

In 2014, with the clinical psychologist David M Clark, he published the book Thrive: The Power of Evidence-Based Psychological Therapies, in which the authors demonstrate the potential value of the wider availability of modern talking therapies, and include a chapter on mental illness prevention.

Happiness and mental health
Layard has shown that mental illness is the main cause of unhappiness.

Development
In 2015, he was co-author of the report that launched the Global Apollo Programme, which calls for developed nations to commit to spending 0.02% of their GDP for 10 years, to fund co-ordinated research to make carbon-free baseload electricity less costly than electricity from coal by the year 2025.

Critique
Recent research on happiness questioning part of Baron Layard's thesis and suggesting that people do obtain happiness from increased income forms part of ongoing investigations into the Easterlin Paradox.

Personal life
Layard was made a Labour life peer in the House of Lords on 3 May 2000 as Baron Layard, of Highgate in the London Borough of Haringey.

In 1991, he married Molly Christine Meacher, who was formerly married to Michael Meacher. Molly, styled Lady Layard between 2000 and 2006, was herself created a life peer in 2006 as Baroness Meacher. They are one of the few couples to both hold titles in their own right.

Layard has said he was strongly Christian at school, lost his faith at university, and in his later years 'has to be believe there is some purpose in the universe... which gives me comfort.'

Honours
In 2003, Layard was elected a Fellow of the British Academy (FBA). In 2016, he was elected a Fellow of the Academy of Social Sciences (FAcSS).

Selected bibliography 
Books
 
 

Book chapters
 
 

Journal articles

Arms

See also
 A happy society

References

External links
Richard Layard. Home page at the London School of Economics.
Lionel Robbins Memorial Lecture Part 1 Happiness: Has social science a clue?
Lionel Robbins Memorial Lecture Part 2 Income and happiness: rethinking economic policy
Lionel Robbins Memorial Lecture Part 3 What would make a happier society?
The Depression Report. LSE CEP page.
Richard Layard – LSE Experts entry
 

1934 births
Living people
People educated at Eton College
Labour Party (UK) life peers
British economists
Labor economists
Alumni of the London School of Economics
Academics of the London School of Economics
Global Apollo Programme
Fellows of the Econometric Society
People involved with mental health
Honorary Fellows of the London School of Economics
Fellows of the British Academy
Fellows of the Academy of Social Sciences
Spouses of life peers
Life peers created by Elizabeth II